Antun Vrančić High School(Croatian: Gimnazija Antuna Vrančića) is a public 4-year general-education high school in Šibenik, Croatia. It currently offers programs focusing on mathematics and natural sciences, classics, linguistics, as well as a general-track program. The school was named after Antun Vrančić (1504-1573), a native of Šibenik.

History 
First modern high school was opened for a short time in Šibenik during Napoleon's rule in Dalmatia in 1806. A secondary school with a continuity up till the present-day was opened as Realgymnasium in 1909, while Šibenik and Croatia were a part of Austria-Hungary. School was briefly closed by Italian authorities during the 1918-21 occupation of Šibenik. In 1937 the school moved into a new and modern building in which it operates today. During the Second World War, Italian fascists again occupied Šibenik (1941-3) and forbade the use of Croatian, italianizing the school. Many students and alumni joined the Partisans and fought against the Axis. After the war, the school was restructured and named after People's Heroes of Šibenik (Ljubo Truta, Miro Visic, Vlado Peran, Slobodan Macura). In 1991 it was again remodelled as a general high school and named after Antun Vrančić (1504-1573), renaissance humanist, cardinal, diplomat and author from Šibenik.

Academics and rankings 
Following the results of national standardized tests taken by high school students in Croatia in 2006, 2007 and 2008 as a part of a transition towards the introduction of a nationwide exit exam (Matura), Antun Vrančić high school was ranked 24th out of 190 Croatian high schools on an unofficial list.

School's students also participated in International Mathematical Olympiad twice - in 2001 in Washington, DC and in 2002 in Glasgow, where they won a bronze medal. In 2007 and 2011, Antun Vrančić students competed at International Philosophy Olympiad in Turkey and Austria, respectively, earning an honorable mentioning.

Notable alumni 

As up until recently the only general secondary school in Šibenik, the school boasts many famous natives of Šibenik and the surrounding area as its alumni:

Ivo Brešan (1936–2017), playwright and author
Gojko Bjedov (1913–1937), trade union leader, volunteer in Spanish civil war (KIA)
 Arsen Dedić (1938–2015), singer-songwriter, composer, poet
 Vladan Desnica (1905–1967), writer and philosopher
 Isak Drutter (1925), economist, university professor, governor of Central Bank of Croatia (1972–1978). Dismissed from school in 1941 under fascist regime
 Vojin Jelić (1921–2004), writer and poet
 Aleksandar Ljahnicky (1921–2004), architect
 Maksim Mrvica (1975), pianist
 Hrvoje Požar (1916–1991), electrical engineer, scholar, and Secretary General of the Croatian Academy of Arts and Sciences
Anđelko Runjić (1938–2015), politician, last speaker of the parliament in SR Croatia (1986–90) and Croatian ambassador to Russia (1991–1992)
 Ivan Vitić (1917–1986), architect (did not graduate)
 Vice Vukov (1936–2007), singer, philosopher, member of the parliament

Gallery

References

Sources 

Šibenik
Gymnasiums in Croatia
Educational institutions established in 1909
Buildings and structures in Šibenik-Knin County
1909 establishments in Austria-Hungary